Flaming Waters is a 1925 American silent drama film directed by F. Harmon Weight and starring Malcolm McGregor, Pauline Garon, and Mary Carr.

Plot
As described in a film magazine review, Danny O'Neil moves to Oil City with his mother, seeking to find Jasper Thorne, who swindled his mother. He gets the best of Thorne in an oil deal and buys a well that turns out to be a gusher, the spray from its overflow covering the area surrounding their ranch. A lamp thrown by Thorne ignites the oil. Danny's foolish friend Midge Botsford opens the gate on the reservoir, and a flaming flood results. Danny rescues his mother and Doris Laidlaw, and he wins the young woman's heart.

Cast

References

Bibliography
 Munden, Kenneth White. The American Film Institute Catalog of Motion Pictures Produced in the United States, Part 1. University of California Press, 1997.

External links

 
 
 
 
 

1925 films
American black-and-white films
Film Booking Offices of America films
Films directed by F. Harmon Weight
1920s English-language films
1920s American films